Oh Min-suk (born April 22, 1980) is a South Korean actor. He was known by his ex-stage name Han Ki-joo.

Filmography

Film

Television series

Web series

Television shows

Music videos

Awards and nominations

Notes

References

External links 

Oh Min-suk Fan Cafe at Daum 

1980 births
Living people
South Korean male stage actors
South Korean male television actors
South Korean male film actors
South Korean male web series actors
21st-century South Korean male actors
Male actors from Seoul
Kyung Hee University alumni